XHMIA-FM is a radio station on 89.3 FM in Mérida, Yucatán, Mexico. It is owned by Multimedia del Sureste, S.A. de C.V. and carries a format known as Radio Mundo.

History
XHTVY-FM received its concession on September 24, 1992, promptly changing its callsign to the current XHMIA-FM before signing on in 1996. It was owned by Arturo Iglesias y Villalobos, with José Laris Iturbide of Cadena RASA assisting in operations. Though the station was not part of RASA's Yucatán cluster and was run from separate studios, Laris Iturbide became the 50 percent owner of the station's new concessionaire in 2010.

On September 1, 2019, XHMIA moved to a pop format as Wow 89.3, ditching its previous Sona 89.3 moniker. In 2022, the station changed names to Radio Mundo and shifted toward an adult contemporary format.

References

Radio stations in Yucatán
Radio stations established in 1992
1992 establishments in Mexico